Candyman is the second studio album by American rock musician Steve Lukather, released on March 29, 1994, by Columbia Records. It was a collaboration of musicians who were for the most part also in Lukather's band Los Lobotomys.  Toto familiars Simon Phillips and David Paich participated as well as David Garfield, John Peña, Chris Trujillo, Lenny Castro, Larry Klimas, Fee Waybill, Richard Page and Paul Rodgers.  Lukather recorded the album in mostly live takes with little overdubbing.

There was some confusion about whether Candyman was a Steve Lukather album or a Los Lobotomys album.  The Japanese and US releases of Candyman were under the Los Lobotomys name rather than Lukather's; the Japanese release also featured a version of the Hendrix song "Red House."  The European release of Candyman was credited to Lukather alone.  Additionally, the touring band for the album was sometimes introduced as "Steve Lukather and Los Lobotomys" and sometimes as just "Los Lobotomys."

The song "Borrowed Time" was released as a single in Europe and included "Red House" as a B-side.

Track listing
"Hero with a 1000 Eyes" (Lukather, Garfield, Fee Waybill) - 6:31
"Freedom" (Jimi Hendrix) - 4:08
"Extinction Blues" (Lukather, Garfield, Waybill) - 4:59
"Born Yesterday" (Lukather, Garfield, Waybill) - 7:08
"Never Walk Alone" (Lukather, Garfield) - 9:42
"Party in Simon's Pants" (Lukather, Simon Phillips) - 5:45
"Borrowed Time" (Lukather, Garfield, Waybill) - 7:20
"Never Let Them See You Cry" (Lukather, Garfield, Waybill) - 5:03
"Froth" (Lukather, Garfield) - 9:41
"The Bomber" (Joe Walsh, Vince Guaraldi) - 5:32
"Song for Jeff" (Lukather, Garfield) - 7:07
"Red House" (Jimi Hendrix) (US and Japanese bonus track)

Personnel 
 Steve Lukather – lead vocals, backing vocals, all guitars
 David Garfield – keyboards, acoustic piano
 David Paich – organ (5)
 John Peña – bass
 Simon Phillips – drums
 Lenny Castro – percussion 
 Chris Trujillo – percussion
 Larry Klimas – saxophones
 Kevin Curry – backing vocals
 Richard Page - backing vocals 
 Fee Waybill – backing vocals
 Paul Rodgers – vocals (2)

Production 
 Steve Lukather – producer 
 Tom Fletcher – producer, recording, mixing 
 Erich Gobel – overdub recording 
 Lee Waters – overdub recording
 Peter Doell – assistant engineer, tracking
 Sean O'Dwyer – assistant engineer
 Charlie Paakkari – assistant engineer, tracking
 Bill Airey Smith – assistant engineer, tracking, mixing 
 Arnie Acosta – mastering 
 Joe Birkman – technician 
 Mike Guerra – technician
 Tom Ketterer – technician
 Jeff Minnich – technician
 Danny Thomas – technician
 Gina Zangla – package design 
 Jack Andersen – cover photography 
 Armando Gallo – additional photography 

Studios
 Recorded and Mixed at Capitol Studios (Hollywood, California).
 Overdubbed at Devonshire Sound Studios (North Hollywood, California).
 Mastered at A&M Studios (Hollywood, California).

References

External links
 Album information

1994 albums
Steve Lukather albums

Albums recorded at Capitol Studios